Berberis baluchistanica is a species of flowering plant in the family Berberidaceae, native to western Pakistan. 
It produces a unique flavone, berberisinol.

References

baluchistanica
Endemic flora of Pakistan
Plants described in 1945